Da'a'im al-Islam ( lit. The Pillars of Islam) is an Ismaili Shia Islam Muslim book of jurisprudence.
 
The book was written by Al-Qadi al-Nu'man. He served as da'i of four imams (from Ismaili 11th Imam Abdullah al-Mahdi Billah to 14th Imam Al-Aziz Billah the first four Fatimid caliphs of Egypt). The book emphasizes what importance Islam has given to manners and etiquette along with Ibadah, the worship of God, citing references of first four Fatimid imams and earlier Shia imams, Muhammad al-Baqir and Jafar-as-Sadiq.

Subsequent Fatimid imams and caliphs and Ismaili dai's have relied on Da'a'im-ul-Islam'.  The 16th Fatimid imam - Caliph Al-Hakim bi-Amr Allah (996-1021) ordered his da'i, Harun bin Mohammed in Yemen, to give decisions in light of Da'a'im al-Islam only.

References

Sources

Shia hadith collections
Ismaili literature